Nenad Trajković (born Naser Trajković; 10 February 1961), is a Serbian basketball coach.

Early life 
Naser Trajković was born in Belgrade, SR Serbia, SFR Yugoslavia. Later he changed his first name to Nenad.

Coaching career 
Trajković started his coaching career as an assistant coach for Partizan, where he had three stints from 1987 to 1995. He worked under the Partizan's head coaches Duško Vujošević, Željko Obradović, Željko Lukajić, Borislav Džaković and Ranko Žeravica. Trajković coached Serbian teams Borac Čačak, Sloga and Partizan. In the 1999–2000 season, he won Yugoslav Basketball Cup for Partizan.

In 2003, Trajković went abroad. He was a head coach for Banjalučka pivara (Bosnia and Herzegovina), Krka (Slovenia) and Verviers-Pepinster (Belgium). He also worked as an assistant coach for Real Madrid (Spain), Dynamo Moscow (Russia) and Lottomatica Roma (Italy). In 2010–11 season, he was an assistant coach for the NBA team Phoenix Suns.

Trajković also worked as a scout for the Cleveland Cavaliers in 2005.

On July 14, 2018, Trajković became a head coach for Igokea. On November 5, 2018, he left Igokea. In September 2019, Trajković became a head coach for Studentski centar of the Montenegrin League. In June 2020, he signed a three-year contract extension for Studentski centar. He left Studentski centar after the 2020–21 season.

International teams 
Trajković coached Yugoslavia men's university team that won the silver medal at the 1999 Summer Universiade in Palma de Mallorca, Spain.

Trajković worked with the Yugoslavia youth national teams in 1998 and 2000. He coached the Yugoslavian University man national team in 1999 at Palma de Mallorca, FR Yugoslavia U–20 team at the 2000 FIBA Europe Under-20 Championship.

Trajković was a head coach of the Iran national team and Latvia national team. Also, he was an assistant coach of the Bosnia and Herzegovina national team at the EuroBasket 2015.

Career achievements 
As a head coach
 ABA League Second Division champion: 1 (with Studentski centar: 2020–21)
 Yugoslav Cup winner: 1 (with Partizan: 1999–2000)
 Slovenian Supercup winner: 1 (with Krka: 2011–12)

As an assistant coach 
 Yugoslav League champion: 2 (with Partizan: 1986–87, 1994–95)
 Yugoslav Cup winner: 2 (with Partizan: 1993–94, 1994–95)

See also 
 List of Serbian NBA coaches
 List of foreign NBA coaches
 List of KK Partizan head coaches
 Nasser (name)

References

External links 
 
 Coach Profile at eurobasket.com

1961 births
Living people
Cleveland Cavaliers scouts
KK Borac Banja Luka coaches
KK Borac Čačak coaches
KK Igokea coaches
KK Krka coaches
KK Partizan coaches
KK Sloga coaches
KK Studentski centar coaches
National Basketball Association scouts from Europe
Phoenix Suns assistant coaches
RBC Verviers-Pepinster coaches
Serbian men's basketball coaches
Serbian basketball scouts
Serbian expatriate basketball people in Belgium
Serbian expatriate basketball people in Bosnia and Herzegovina
Serbian expatriate basketball people in Iran
Serbian expatriate basketball people in Italy
Serbian expatriate basketball people in Latvia
Serbian expatriate basketball people in Montenegro
Serbian expatriate basketball people in Slovenia
Serbian expatriate basketball people in Spain
Serbian expatriate basketball people in Russia
Serbian expatriate basketball people in the United States
Sportspeople from Belgrade
University of Belgrade Faculty of Sport and Physical Education alumni
University of Belgrade School of Electrical Engineering alumni
Yugoslav basketball coaches